L'Ambroisie is a traditional French restaurant in Paris, France founded by Bernard Pacaud and now run by his son Mathieu that has maintained three Michelin stars for more than thirty years. The name "L'Ambroisie" ("Ambrosia" in English) comes from Greek mythology and means both "food for gods" and "source of immortality."

Location 
The restaurant is in a period house on the southwestern corner of the Place des Vosges in Paris. In the 17th and 18th centuries, Place des Vosges was an upper-class and noble neighborhood.

Founder 
The restaurant's founder and head chef is Bernard Pacaud. He was abandoned by his parents at age 13 and raised in an orphanage in the mountains of Lyonnais.

Pacaud started cooking at age 15, in 1962, as an apprentice at the famed Eugenie (Mére) Brazier's restaurant  located 20 km from Lyon. Pacaud spent the next three years as commis at the Tante Alice restaurant in Lyon before becoming chef de partie at La Méditerranée in Paris. Pushed by Eugénie Brazier's encouragements, he applied to work in 1976 with Claude Peyrot, the chef and owner of the Vivarois (a Michelin three star restaurant) on avenue Victor Hugo in Paris. In 1981, he opened his own restaurant quai de la Tournelle (at the crossing with rue de Bièvres) in Paris. In 1986, he opened L'Ambroisie at place des Vosges and obtained three Michelins stars in 1988 which he has kept since then. His refined and classical cooking style makes it one on the most esteemed French restaurants.

Pacaud rarely comes into the public's sight because he devotes himself to cuisine in the kitchen. Pacaud deeply values the quality of ingredients. When he first opened the restaurant, ingredient costs caused him to run a deficit. He has been described as following traditional processes of making food, taking the utmost care in dishes, and presenting every plate as an elegant art. He frequently combines multiple food in one dish.

Pacaud passed on the restaurant to his son Mathieu in 2012 but continues to pays close attention and makes sure the restaurant maintains its high-level service and quality.

History 

 L'Ambroisie won the First Michelin star in 1982, and won the second one in the following year.
 L'Ambroisie won the Third Michelin star in 1988, 5 years after winning the second star.
 In November 2015, President Barack Obama had dinner with President Francois Hollande and US Secretary of State John Kerry at L'Ambroisie.
 L'Ambroisie was mentioned in the "One more time" monologue by James Spader playing Raymond Reddington in the episode Anslo Garrick of television show The Blacklist
 In 2019, L'Ambroisie was featured in the Japanese TV drama グランメゾン東京 ("Grand Maison Tokyo") as one of the restaurants in which the drama took place.

See also
 List of Michelin starred restaurants

References

Restaurants in Paris
Michelin Guide starred restaurants in France
Buildings and structures in the 4th arrondissement of Paris